Joakim Berner (born 21 November 1957) is a Finnish former professional tennis player.

Berner's family runs the Finnish conglomerate Berner Oy, founded by his great-grandfather. His father Erik, who served as CEO of the company, was also involved in tennis and captained the Finland Davis Cup team.

Active on tour in the 1980s, Berner featured in qualifying at Wimbledon and made two doubles finals on the ATP Challenger Tour. He was a doubles quarter-finalist at the 1986 Swedish Open.

Berner, a Davis Cup player in 1980 and 1981, served as the team's captain from 2005 to 2007.

ATP Challenger finals

Doubles: 2 (0–2)

References

External links
 
 
 

1957 births
Living people
Finnish male tennis players
Sportspeople from Helsinki